Communist Labor Party may refer to:
Communist Labor Party of America, founded in 1919, merged with the Communist Party of America (Minority Faction) to form the United Communist Party in 1920
Communist Labor Party of North America, an anti-revisionist communist group in the 1970s
Communist Labour Party of Turkey
Communist Labour Party of Turkey/Leninist

See also
Communist Party of Labour in the Dominican Republic